The James Blair Middle School, formerly the James Blair Junior High School is a historic school building at 730 Spotswood Avenue in Norfolk, Virginia.  Its original main block is a three-story brick building with limestone trim, and Beaux Arts styling.  Built in 1922 to a design by the local architectural firm of Calrow, Wrenn, and Tazewell, it was the first junior high school to be built by the city school administration.  The school is named for James Blair, one of the founders of Virginia's College of William and Mary, and was converted to a middle school in the 1980s.

The building was listed on the National Register of Historic Places in 2000.

See also
National Register of Historic Places listings in Norfolk, Virginia

References

School buildings on the National Register of Historic Places in Virginia
National Register of Historic Places in Norfolk, Virginia
Beaux-Arts architecture in Virginia
School buildings completed in 1921
Education in Norfolk, Virginia
1921 establishments in Virginia